Badja Medu Djola (born Bernard Bradley; April 9, 1948 – January 8, 2005) was an American actor from Brooklyn,  New York who worked primarily within black film. He is best known for Mississippi Burning, Penitentiary, A Rage in Harlem, and Who's the Man?.

Career
Djola's breakout role was as Leon Isaac Kennedy’s cellmate, the villainous "Half Dead" Johnson, in the 1979 movie Penitentiary, which led to many more feature films, including a supporting role in Wes Craven’s 1988 movie The Serpent and the Rainbow. He starred alongside Danny Glover in the 1991 film A Rage in Harlem and Dr. Dre in Who's the Man? (1993). In addition to movies, Djola appeared in several television shows, including The X-Files, Nash Bridges, and NYPD Blue. He also starred in theatre performances, with shows including Once in a Wife Time (1981)," Edmond (1984), 227, Southern Rapture (1993), and Dancing on Moonlight (1995),

Personal life
Djola died of a heart attack on January 8, 2005, in Los Angeles, California.

Filmography

Film

Television

References

External links

1948 births
2005 deaths
African-American male actors
American male film actors
American male television actors
Burials at Inglewood Park Cemetery
People from Brooklyn
20th-century American male actors
20th-century African-American people
21st-century African-American people